Hissam Ali Hyder born March 7, 1982, in Lahore, is a +6 goal Pakistani polo player.

Hissam, also known as "Namoo", learnt how to play polo from his father Irfan Ali Haider, who was a +4 goal player.

References

External links
World Cup 2004

Pakistani polo players
1982 births
Living people